The 1995 Reading Borough Council election was held on 4 May 1995, at the same time as other local elections across Britain. Sixteen of the 45 seats on Reading Borough Council were up for election, being the usual third of the council (15 seats) plus a by-election in Redlands ward, where Labour councillor Robert Sulley had resigned. Labour increased its majority on the council. The Labour leader on the council ahead of the election was Mike Orton, but he stood down as party and council leader immediately after the election, being replaced by David Sutton.

Results

Ward results
The results in each ward were as follows (candidates with an asterisk* were the previous incumbent standing for re-election):

References

1995 English local elections
1995